Ahalya Sthan (also called Ahilya Sthan or Ahilya Asthan) is a Hindu temple located at Ahiyari South in the city of Darbhanga, State of Bihar, India.
The temple is dedicated to Ahalya.

Legend 
According to Ramayana, Rama and Lakshmana went to forest with Brahmarshi Vishvamitra to protect his yagna. On their way, they came across a deserted place. When Rama inquired about the place, Visvamitra related the story of Sati Ahalya, wife of Gautama Maharishi. 
The Maharishi used to do penance by staying here with his wife. One day when Gautama Rishi had gone out of the ashram, in his absence, Indra came in disguised as Gautama Rishi. Ahalya, without knowing the real identity of the person, succumbed to Indra's desire. Gautam Maharishi came to know this and cursed his wife to lie as a stone in this place. When she pleaded, the maharishi said, when Rama visits this place, you will return to your normal self.
Visvamitra told Rama to go into the ashram. As soon as Rama's radiance brightened the place, Ahalya stood up with her own body and prayed to Rama. Ahalya being the wife of Maharishi, Rama and Lakshmana paid their obeisance to her.

The temple 
Ahalya Sthan is the place where once the ashram of Maharishi Gautama stood. The temple, in its present structural form was built between 1662 and 1682 during the rule of Maharaja Chhatra Singh and Maharaja Rudra Singh. This is  also the first Ram Janaki temple in India.
The temple is beautifully made with fine patterns and designs of art and ancient Indian architecture. Inside the shrine, there is a flat stone said to contain the foot prints of Sita, wife of Ram, as the main object of worship.

Festivals 
The temple is open from 5 a.m. till 10 p.m. daily. Ramanavami is celebrated, in the Hindu month of Chaitra (March end - April beginning) and Vivah Panchami in Agrahayana.

References

External links 
 (Narration in Hindi)

Hindu temples in Bihar
Rama temples